Springfield Seed Co. Office and Warehouse is a historic warehouse building located at Springfield, Missouri, United States. Built about 1936, it is a three-story, rectangular steel-reinforced concrete and brick commercial building.  It features continuous bays of multiple-paned steel hopper-sash windows.

It was listed on the National Register of Historic Places in 2006.

References

Commercial buildings on the National Register of Historic Places in Missouri
Commercial buildings completed in 1936
Buildings and structures in Springfield, Missouri
National Register of Historic Places in Greene County, Missouri